A by-election was held on 29 August 2020 for the seat of Slim in the Perak State Legislative Assembly. The seat fell vacant following the sudden death of the incumbent Member of the Legislative Assembly (MLA) from United Malays National Organisation (UMNO) of the Barisan Nasional (BN) coalition, Mohd. Khusairi Abdul Talib, 59, due to a heart attack on 15 July 2020. He had held the seat for four terms since 2004.

The Election Commission (EC) had set the nomination day on 15 August 2020, early voting on 25 August and polling day for 29 August with a 14-day campaign period.

Background

The small town of Slim River in Perak has a population of 27,139 residents comprising Malays (74 per cent), Indians (12 per cent), Chinese (10 per cent), Orang Asli (1.4 per cent) and others. The corresponding Slim state constituency has 23,094 registered voters comprising 22,815 normal voters, 277 early voters as well as 2 absentee voters overseas. The by-election to be conducted under the special guidelines and standard operating procedures (SOPs) imposed by EC due to the New Normal as the country is still observing the recovery phase of Movement Control Order (MCO) for COVID-19 pandemic.

The by-election is unlikely to affect the Perak state political scene, as the results of by-election would has no bearing on the position of the state government amidst the looming talks of snap elections following the 2020 political crisis. There are 59 state seats in Perak in which 32 formed the Perikatan Nasional (PN) coalition comprising 25 BN (UMNO), 4 BERSATU and 3 PAS; compare to 24 seats holds by Pakatan Harapan (PH) coalition comprising 16 DAP, 5 AMANAH, 3 PKR; meanwhile  2 Independent and 1 GERAKAN; as just upon the seat vacancy. One of the independent assemblyman, Hasnul Zulkarnain Abdul Munaim, 2 weeks later joined PN's component BERSATU on 29 July 2020.

Nominations
Perak Menteri Besar and BERSATU chief, Ahmad Faizal Azumu has said that Perikatan Nasional (PN) will field a candidate from UMNO to defend the Slim state seat in the by-election. Barisan Nasional (BN) secretary-general Annuar Musa said UMNO will pick the candidate for the Slim by-election, in which BN with Muafakat Nasional (MN)'s UMNO-PAS and BERSATU together will set up a joined committee named Muafakat Nasional 'Plus'. BN has named acting Tanjung Malim UMNO chief Mohd Zaidi Aziz, 43, as its candidate for the Slim state by-election.

Pakatan Harapan (PH) secretariat secretary Saifuddin Nasution Ismail had confirmed that PH will not be contesting the by-election for the Slim state seat. PH is to make way to former BERSATU chairman Dr Mahathir Mohamad’s  faction to contest instead. Ahead of the by-election, Dr Mahathir has announces the formation by the initially dubbed "BERSATU Blackout" faction's new party, Parti Pejuang Tanah Air (Pejuang) or the Fighters of the Nation Party. The yet-to-be registered Pejuang party has also names Syariah lawyer, Amir Khusyairi Mohamad Tanusi, 38, as their candidate with PH endorsement for the Slim poll, who will be contesting as an Independent.

On nomination day, BN's Mohd Zaidi and Pejuang's Amir Khusyairi (tree symbol) along with another independent, former teacher Santharasekaran a/l Subramaniam (book symbol), 44, filed their nomination papers to set for a three-cornered fight in the by-election. There were also two other individuals who turned up that morning but didn't submit their nomination papers as independent candidates due to personal technical reasons.

Controversies and issues
Members of the BERSATU Youth (ARMADA) were "booed" during the launching ceremony of the BN Youth Campaign Machinery. Supporters of BN started "booing" the ARMADA members after BN Chairman, Ahmad Zahid Hamidi announced that BERSATU will join the Muafakat Nasional pact.

On the morning of poling day, several voters were prevented from entering a polling centre merely for wearing shorts which led to a protest when the affected voters unable to cast their ballots. EC chairman Abdul Ghani Salleh had later explained it was a miscommunication as there is no Act that forbids a voter donning shorts from entering a polling centre.

Result

Results based on polling district
BN won all districts.

Previous result

References

2020 elections in Malaysia
By-elections in Malaysia
Elections in Perak
August 2020 events in Malaysia